1 Chronicles 17 is the seventeenth chapter of the Books of Chronicles in the Hebrew Bible or the First Book of Chronicles in the Old Testament of the Christian Bible. The book is compiled from older sources by an unknown person or group, designated by modern scholars as "the Chronicler", and had the final shape established in late fifth or fourth century BCE. This chapter contains God's covenant with David through the prophet Nathan and David's response in the form of thanksgiving prayer. The whole chapter belongs to the section focusing on the kingship of David (1 Chronicles 9:35 to 29:30).

Text
This chapter was originally written in the Hebrew language. It is divided into 27 verses.

Textual witnesses
Some early manuscripts containing the text of this chapter in Hebrew are of the Masoretic Text tradition, which includes the Aleppo Codex (10th century), and Codex Leningradensis (1008).

There is also a translation into Koine Greek known as the Septuagint, made in the last few centuries BCE. Extant ancient manuscripts of the Septuagint version include Codex Vaticanus (B; B; 4th century), Codex Sinaiticus (S; BHK: S; 4th century), Codex Alexandrinus (A; A; 5th century) and Codex Marchalianus (Q; Q; 6th century).

Old Testament references
: .
:.

God’s covenant with David (17:1–15)
This section closely follows  with minor redaction to suit the context. Nathan's personal opinion (verse 2) was corrected by God in the subsequent prophecy, without mentioning David's lack of suitability for building the temple (explained later in ).

Verse 1
"Under a tent": literally "under tent curtains" (cf. ,7).
The statement "and the Lord had given him rest from all his enemies around him" in 2 Samuel 7:1 is not copied by the Chronicler, because David's wars have yet to be described (1 Chronicles 18–20).

Verse 14
"And I will establish him in My house and in My kingdom forever; and his throne shall be established forever."
"In My kingdom forever": The kingship of God is manifested through David's kingdom and his heirs (1 Chronicles 28:5; 29:11; 2 Chronicles 13:8; cf. 2 Samuel 7:16).
Here the Chronicler portrays 'the seed after David', arising from his sons, as the Messiah, whom the prophets announced as the "Son of David", a divergence from 2 Samuel 7:14-16, so it omits "If he commit iniquity, I will chasten him with the rod of men" (2 Samuel 7:14), because the chastisement would be important for the direct sons of David and the kings of Judah, but not for the Messiah, from whom God will never withdraw His grace.

David’s Prayer of Thanksgiving (17:16–27)
This passage contains David's prayer as a reply to the promise given by God through Nathan. Apart from a slight change in the name used for God, the section closely follows 2 Samuel 7:17–29.

See also

Related Bible parts: Exodus 26, Numbers 4, 1 Kings 4, 1 Chronicles 22, 2 Chronicles 1

References

Sources

External links
 Jewish translations:
 Divrei Hayamim I - I Chronicles - Chapter 17 (Judaica Press) translation [with Rashi's commentary] at Chabad.org
 Christian translations:
 Online Bible at GospelHall.org (ESV, KJV, Darby, American Standard Version, Bible in Basic English)
 First Book of Chronicles Chapter 17. Bible Gateway

17